The following are some of the association football events of the year 1992 throughout the world.

Events 

5 May – A provisional tribune crashes in the Stade Armand Cesari in Bastia, Corsica during the semi-final of the Coupe de France between Bastia SC and Olympique de Marseille. Eighteen people die, while 2.300 fans get injured.
9 May – Liverpool wins 2–0 over Sunderland to claim the FA Cup.
17 June – The Copa Libertadores is won by São Paulo FC after the defeat of Newell's Old Boys 3–2 via a penalty shootout after a final aggregate score of 1–1.
26 June – In Euro 1992, Denmark surprisingly won 2–0 over Germany at Nya Ullevi, Gothenburg, Sweden.
30 June – Due to financial problems Dutch club FC Wageningen is disestablished, after having played its last match one month earlier against NAC Breda in the Eerste Divisie.
France wins the right to host for a second time the Football World Cup in the year 1998: Football World Cup 1998
10 July – The Major Indoor Soccer League ceases operation after 14 seasons in the United States.
9 September – Dick Advocaat makes his debut as the manager of Dutch national team, as the successor of Rinus Michels, with a 2–3 friendly defeat against Italy in Eindhoven.
14 October – Marco van Basten makes his last appearance for the Dutch national team, earning his 58th cap against Poland. Gerald Vanenburg (42nd) and Berry van Aerle (35th) also play their last match for the Dutch, while Arthur Numan makes his debut in the World Cup qualifier in De Kuip, Rotterdam.
12 December – São Paulo FC wins the Intercontinental Cup in Tokyo, Japan by defeating Spain's FC Barcelona (1–2). Raí scores twice for the Brazilians.

Winner club national championships

Asia
  – Al-Ittihad
  – POSCO Atoms

Europe
  – Lyngby BK
  – 
 Football League First Division - Leeds United
 Football League Second Division - Ipswich Town
 Football League Third Division - Brentford
 Football League Fourth Division - Burnley
  – VfB Stuttgart
  – Ireland – Shelbourne
  – A.C. Milan
 
 Eredivisie – PSV Eindhoven
 Eerste Divisie – Cambuur Leeuwarden
  – FC Porto
 : for more complete coverage see: 1991-92 in Scottish football
Scottish Premier Division – Rangers
Scottish Division One – Dundee
Scottish Division Two – Dumbarton
Scottish Cup – Rangers
Scottish League Cup– Rangers
  
La Liga – FC Barcelona
Copa del Rey – Atlético Madrid
  – AIK
  – Beşiktaş

North America
 – Winnipeg Fury (CSL)
 – León

APSL – Colorado Foxes 
Professional Cup – Colorado Foxes

South America

Clausura – Newell's Old Boys
Apertura – Club Atlético Boca Juniors
 – Bolívar
 – Flamengo
 – El Nacional
 Paraguay – Cerro Porteño

International tournaments 
 African Cup of Nations in Senegal ( 12–26 January 1992)
 
 
 
 UEFA European Football Championship in Sweden ( 10–26 June 1992)
 
 
 —
 Baltic Cup in Liepāja, Latvia ( 10–12 July 1992)
 
 
 
Olympic Games in Barcelona, Spain (24 July – 8 August 1992)

National team results

Asia



Europe









South America

The men's national senior squad didn't play any matches in 1992



Movies
Ladybugs (USA)

Births

 1 January
Daniel Kofi Agyei, Ghanaian footballer
Jack Wilshere, English footballer
 6 January
Nika Dzalamidze, Georgian international footballer
Kita, Brazilian international footballer (died 2015)
 8 January: Apostolos Vellios, Greek international footballer
 9 January: Edon Hasani, Albanian youth international
 10 January: Christian Atsu, Ghanaian footballer (died 2023)
 13 January: Santiago Arias, Colombian international footballer
 20 January: Jorge Zárate, Mexican club footballer
 22 January: Vincent Aboubakar, Cameroonian international footballer
 27 January: Jean (Jean Acosta Soares), Brazilian professional footballer
 7 February: Sergi Roberto, Spanish international  
 21 February: Phil Jones, English international
 23 February: Terry Hawkridge, English club footballer
 29 February
 Francesco Gazo, Italian footballer
 Jawad El Yamiq, Moroccan footballer
 Guido Herrera, Argentinian footballer
 Perry Kitchen, American soccer player
 Saphir Taïder, French-Algerian footballer
 4 March:
 Erik Lamela, Argentine footballer  
 Bernd Leno, German footballer  
 27 March: Pedro Obiang, Spanish-Equatoguinean professional footballer
 28 March: Sergi Gómez, Spanish footballer
 14 April: Frederik Sørensen, Danish footballer
 15 April: John Guidetti, Swedish footballer 
 17 April: Shkodran Mustafi, German footballer  
 20 April:
 Kristian Álvarez, Mexican footballer
 Marko Meerits, Estonian footballer
 30 April: Marc-André ter Stegen, German footballer  
 1 May: Matěj Vydra, Czech footballer
 17 May: Amro Tarek, Egyptian footballer
 18 May: Brian Idowu, Nigerian footballer
 20 May: Gerónimo Rulli, Argentine footballer
 22 May: Syaiful Indra Cahya, Indonesian footballer
 27 May: Jeison Murillo, Colombian footballer
 15 June: Mohamed Salah, Egyptian footballer
 28 June: Oscar Hiljemark, Swedish footballer
 4 July
 Ángel Romero, Paraguayan footballer
 Óscar Romero, Paraguayan footballer
 5 July: Alberto Moreno, Spanish footballer
 6 July: Seedy Bah, Gambian footballer 
 17 July: Denis Prychynenko, Ukrainian-German footballer
 23 July: Danny Ings, English footballer
 24 July: Dionatan Teixeira, Brazilian-born Slovakian footballer (d. 2017)
 29 July: Djibril Sidibé, French international  
 7 August: Wout Weghorst, Dutch international footballer
 20 August:
Andrei Peteleu, Romanian junior international
Deniss Rakels, Latvian international
 24 August: Bertolomeu Verdial,  East Timorese footballer
 2 September: Emiliano Martínez, Argentine international footballer
 17 September: Stuart Bannigan, Scottish footballer
 27 September: Granit Xhaka, Swiss international footballer
 20 October: Mattia De Sciglio, Italian footballer
 3 November: Willi Orban, German-born Hungarian international footballer
 14 December: Ryo Miyaichi, Japanese footballer

Deaths

February
 17 February – Delio Morollón (54), Spanish footballer
 24 February – August Lešnik (77), Croatian footballer

April
 2 April – Juanito (37), Spanish footballer

September
 12 September – Emilio Recoba (88), Uruguayan defender, last surviving winner of the 1930 FIFA World Cup
 16 September – Larbi Ben Barek (78), Moroccan-French footballer

December
 1 December – Anton Malatinský (72), Slovak football player and coach

References

External links
  Rec.Sport.Soccer Statistics Foundation
  VoetbalStats

 
Association football by year